Poľov is a borough (city ward) of the city of Košice, Slovakia. The borough retains much of its rural character.

History 

The first written record of Poľov dates back to 1248.

In the 20th century, Poľov lost village municipality status and was annexed to Košice as one of its boroughs.

Statistics
 Area: 
 Population: 1,198 (December 2017)
 Density of population: 92/km2 (December 2017)
 District: Košice II
 Mayor: Ladislav Brada (as of 2018 elections)

Gallery

References

External links

 Official website of the Poľov borough
 Article on the Poľov borough at Cassovia.sk
 Official website of the town of Košice

Boroughs of Košice
Villages in Slovakia merged with towns